Melvin J. Lerner, Professor of Social Psychology at the University of Waterloo between 1970 and 1994 and now a visiting scholar at Florida Atlantic University, has been called "a pioneer in the psychological study of justice."

Education
Lerner received his Ph.D. in Social Psychology in 1957 at New York University.

Career
After his Ph.D., he was a Post-Doc in Clinical Psychology at Stanford University.

Lerner has been associated with University of California, Berkeley, Washington University in St. Louis, Universities of Utrecht and Leiden in the Netherlands, and other institutions. He was the founding editor of the journal Social Justice Research and the "Critical Issues in Social Justice" series published by Plenum Press.

In 1994, he was awarded Distinguished Professor Emeritus at University of Waterloo. He received the Max-Planck-Forschungspreis together with Leo Montada in 1993 and the Quinquennial Award in 1986. In 2008, he was awarded the Lifetime Achievement Award by the International Society for Justice Research.

Belief in a just world
Lerner is most recognized for the Just-world phenomenon, published in "The Belief in a Just World: A Fundamental Delusion" (1980), and for being co-editor of the first volume devoted to the "Justice Motive" in 1981.

He began studying justice beliefs and the just world hypothesis while exploring the mechanisms behind negative social and societal interactions. Lerner saw his work as extending Stanley Milgram's work on obedience. He wanted to understand how regimes that cause cruelty and suffering maintain popular support, and how people come to accept social norms and laws that produce misery and suffering.

Lerner's research was influenced by repeatedly witnessing the tendency of observers to blame victims for their suffering. During his clinical training as a psychologist, he observed the treatment of mentally ill persons by the health care practitioners with whom he worked. Though he knew the clinicians to be kindhearted, educated people, he observed that they blamed patients for their own suffering. He was also surprised at hearing his students derogate the poor, seemingly oblivious to the structural forces that contribute to poverty. In one of his studies on rewards, he observed that when one of two men was chosen at random to receive a reward for a task, observers felt more praise toward the man who had been randomly rewarded than toward the man who did not receive a reward. Existing social psychological theories, including cognitive dissonance, could not fully explain these phenomena. His desire to understand the processes that caused these phenomena led Lerner to conduct his first experiments on what is now called the just world hypothesis.

See also
 List of University of Waterloo people
 Victim blaming

References

Further reading 
 Lerner, M. & Simmons, C. H. (1966). Observer’s Reaction to the "Innocent Victim": Compassion or Rejection? Journal of Personality and Social Psychology, 4, v. 2.
 Lerner, Melvin J. The Belief in a Just World A Fundamental Delusion (Perspectives in Social Psychology) (1980)
 Lerner, Melvin J. & Lerner, Sally C. The Justice Motive in Social Behavior: Adapting to Times of Scarcity and Change, (New York: Plenum Press, 1981).
 Montada, Leo & Lerner, Melvin J. Responses to Victimization and Belief in a Just World (Critical Issues in Social Justice) (1998)

American social psychologists
American moral psychologists
Jewish American social scientists
New York University alumni
Academic staff of the University of Waterloo
Living people
1929 births
21st-century American Jews
Florida Atlantic University faculty
University of California, Berkeley faculty
Washington University in St. Louis faculty
Academic staff of Utrecht University
Academic staff of Leiden University